The Karay-a language (or) is an Austronesian regional language in the Philippines spoken by the Karay-a people, mainly in Antique.

It is one of the Bisayan languages, mainly along with Aklanon/Malaynon, Capiznon, Cebuano, and Hiligaynon.

Geographical distribution
Kinaray-a is spoken mainly in Antique. It  is also spoken in Iloilo province as a primary or secondary language in the city of Passi, in the municipalities of Alimodian, San Joaquin, Lambunao, Calinog, Leon, Miag-ao, Pavia, Badiangan, San Miguel, Guimbal, San Enrique, Tigbauan, Igbaras, Leganes, Pototan, Bingawan, San Rafael, Mina,  Zarraga, Oton, Santa Barbara, Cabatuan, Janiuay, Maasin, New Lucena, Dueñas, Dingle, and Tubungan, and certain villages in Palawan and Mindanao – especially in the Soccsksargen region (particularly the province of Sultan Kudarat) by citizens who trace their roots to Antique or to Karay-a-speaking areas of Panay island. Inhabitants of most towns across the latter areas speak Kinaray-a while Hiligaynon is predominant around coastal areas particularly in Iloilo. It is also spoken in Iloilo City by a minority, particularly in the Arevalo district and parts of Capiz and Aklan provinces, as well as Guimaras and some parts of Negros Occidental.

Dialects 
There has not been much linguistic study on the dialects of Kinaray-a. Speakers both of Kinaray-a and Hiligaynon would however admit to hearing the differences in the ways by which Kinaray-a speakers from different towns speak. Differences in vocabulary can also observed between and among the dialects.

The differences and the degrees by which the dialects differ from each other depend largely on the area's proximity to another different language-speaking area. Thus, in Antique, there are, on the northern parts, varieties that are similar to Aklanon, the language of Aklan, its neighbor on the north. On the south, in Iloilo towns on the other hand, the dialects closely resemble that of the standard Kinaray-a spoken in San Jose de Buenavista, lowland Sibalom and Hamtic. Two highly accented dialects of Kinaray-a can be heard in Anini-y and Tobias Fornier in Antique and San Joaquin, Leon, and Tubungan in Iloilo.

Some dialects differ only on consonant preference like y vs h. e.g. ('girl') or l vs r e.g. .

Intelligibility with Hiligaynon
Due to geographic proximity and mass media Kinaray-a-speakers can understand Hiligaynon (also known as Ilonggo) speakers. However, only Hiligaynon speakers who reside in Kinaray-a-speaking areas can understand the language. Those who come from other areas, like Iloilo City and Negros Island, have difficulty in understanding the language, if they can at all.

It is a misconception among some Hiligaynon speakers that Kinaray-a is a dialect of Hiligaynon; the reality is that the two belong to two different, but related, branches of the Bisayan languages.

However, most Karay-a also know Hiligaynon as their second language. To some extent, there is an intermediate dialect of Hiligaynon and Kinaray-a being spoken in Mindanao, mainly in Sultan Kudarat province.

Phonology

Vowels  

Consonants

Orthography
The latter builds on Brigadier General 's introduction of a separate letter  for  through the publication of Karay-a Rice Tradition Revisited, but using  in 's place. In 2018, the KWF elaborated,

Vowels 
They do not form diphthongs with each other and always indicate a separate syllable: there are as many vowels as there are syllables.

Consonants 

The digraph  constitutes a single letter and represents the phoneme .

Grammar

Nouns

Pronouns

Numbers

Common expressions 

Saying  (literally 'Where are you going?') is a common way to greet people. The question does not need to be answered directly.

 Are you eating well? – 
 Good. – 
 How are you feeling? –  or:  (What do you feel?)
 I don't know. –  /  (or simply:  – informal, usually an annoyed expression)
 Let's go! –  (usually for hurrying up companions)
 Come together. – 
 Why? – /  (informal)
 I love you. – 
 My love/sweetheart. – 
 What is your name? – 
 Good morning! – 
 Good afternoon! – 
 Good evening! – 
 That one. – ()/ 
 How much? – 
 Yes. –  (Ho-ud)/ 
 No. – /
 Because. – 
 Because of you. –  or 
 About you. –  or 
 You know. – 
 Hurry! –  or 
 Again. –  (or:  ('again') /  (command to repeat).)
 Do you speak English? –  or 
 It is fun to live. – 
Happy – 
Thank you –

See also
Language shift
Hiligaynon
Language revitalization

Notes

References

External links

Taramdan sa Lantipulong Kinaray·a, guide to grammar (Antiqueño dialect)
Marayum Dictionary

Visayan languages
Languages of Antique (province)
Languages of Iloilo
Languages of Aklan
Languages of Capiz
Languages of Guimaras
Languages of Negros Occidental